Yury Aleshchanka (born 6 September 1984) is a retired Belarusian professional footballer.

External links
 Profile at teams.by

1984 births
Living people
Belarusian footballers
Association football forwards
FC Naftan Novopolotsk players
FC Vitebsk players
FC Polotsk players
FC Orsha players
FC Smorgon players
FC Khimik Svetlogorsk players